Charles Billingsley (born January 7, 1970 in Clovis, NM) is a Preacher, christian singer, worship leader, songwriter, speaker and author.

Career 

Billingsley began his solo career the day after he graduated from Samford University in Birmingham, Alabama in 1992. After two years, he joined the contemporary Christian music group NewSong. In 1994, they released People Get Ready featuring "Arise My Love."  That album had four number one hits. After two years with NewSong, Charles left to pursue a solo career, averaging 200 concerts a year.

In 2002 Billingsley became the worship pastor at Thomas Road Baptist Church, as well as the artist-in-residence at Liberty University. In 2005, Billingsley moved to San Diego, California to work with Dr. David Jeremiah at the Shadow Mountain Community Church, home of Turning Point Ministries.

After two years in San Diego, Billingsley returned to Thomas Road Baptist Church where he resumed his position of worship leader and served on the advisory council of the Center for Worship at Liberty University. In 2011, he helped launch a new publishing company, Red Tie Music, that is a partnership with Thomas Road Baptist Church and Liberty University. On May 14, 2017 Billingsley announced he would be returning to Shadow Mountain Community Church to work with Dr. David Jeremiah as worship pastor.

In July 2017, Billingsley became the worship pastor at Shadow Mountain Community Church. Billingsley still travels throughout the year as a worship leader for the Women of Joy, Gridiron Men and Celebrator's conferences as well as a solo concert artist.

In February 2019, Billingsley announced his departure from Shadow Mountain Community Church to pursue his concert ministry full-time.

Discography

References

External links
 

1970 births
Living people
American performers of Christian music
Christians from California
Christians from New Mexico
Christians from Virginia
Songwriters from New Mexico
21st-century American male singers
21st-century American singers
American male songwriters